X Toolkit Intrinsics (also known as Xt, for X toolkit) is a library that implements an API to facilitate the development of programs with a graphical user interface (GUI) for the X Window System. It can be used in the C or C++ languages.

The low-level library Xlib is the client-side implementation of the X11 protocol. It communicates with an X server, but does not provide any function for implementing graphical control elements ("widgets"), such as buttons or menus.

The Xt library provides support for creating widget types, but does not provide any itself. A programmer could use the Xt library to create and use a new type of widget. Xt implemented some object oriented concepts, such as inheritance (the user could make their own button by reusing code written for another type of button), events, and callbacks.

Since the graphical user interface of applications typically requires a number of widget types, most developers are reluctant to write their own, and instead prefer to use libraries such as Xaw, Motif and OLIT that provide a set of widgets.

Most widely used toolkits such as GTK and Qt do not use the Xt library. Rather, they use Xlib or XCB directly.

External links
 X Toolkit Intrinsics – C Language Interface (pdf), X.Org Foundation
 
 The place of Intrinsics in X11, Professor David Marshall, Cardiff School of Computer Science, Cardiff University
 TestXt2, Example C program that creates a Menu Bar using just Xt/Xaw
 

X-based libraries
C (programming language) libraries
Graphics libraries